Corinth, North Carolina may refer to:
Corinth, Chatham County, North Carolina
Corinth, Nash County, North Carolina
Corinth, Rutherford County, North Carolina
Banoak, North Carolina, also known as Corinth
Hocutts Crossroads, North Carolina, also known as Corinth-Holder